Thamnophis couchii, commonly known as Couch's garter snake, the Sierra garter snake, or the western aquatic garter snake, is a species of snake in the family Colubridae. The species is endemic to the western United States.

Etymology
The specific name couchii is in honor of Darius Nash Couch, who was a U.S. Army officer and a naturalist.

Geographic range
T. couchii is native to California and Oregon in the United States.

Habitat
The preferred natural habitats of T. couchii are freshwater wetlands and permanent or temporary bodies of water in grassland, shrubland, and forest.

Behavior
T. couchii is highly aquatic.

Reproduction
T. couchii is viviparous.

References

Further reading
Behler, John L.; King, F. Wayne (1979). The Audubon Society Field Guide to North American Reptiles and Amphibians. New York: Alfred A. Knopf. 743 pp., 657 color plates. . (Thamnophis couchi, pp. 664–666).
Kennicott, Robert (1859). "Eutaenia couchii ". pp. 10–11. In: Baird SF (1859). "No. 4. Report on the Reptiles Collected on the Survey". pp. 9-13 + Plates XI, XXVIII, XXX, XLIV. In: Williamson RS, Abbot HL (1859). ("1855"). Report upon Explorations for a Railroad Route from the Sacramento Valley to the Columbia River. Part IV. Zoological Report. Washington, District of Columbia: United States War Department. (Eutaenia couchii, new species).
Smith, Hobart M.; Brodie, Edmund D., Jr. (1982). Reptiles of North America: A Guide to Field Identification. New York: Golden Press. 240 pp.  (paperback),  (hardcover). (Thamnophis couchi, pp. 150–151).
Stebbins, Robert C. (2003). A Field Guide to Western Reptiles and Amphibians, Third Edition. The Peterson Field Guide Series ®. Boston and New York: Houghton Mifflin. xiii + 533 pp., 56 color plates, 204 maps. (Thamnophis couchii, p. 381-382, Figure 27 + Plate 49 + Map 167).

Reptiles described in 1859
Taxa named by Robert Kennicott
Reptiles of the United States
Fauna of the Sierra Nevada (United States)
Thamnophis